Traitor's Gate is a 1964 West German-British co-production of a black-and-white crime film directed by Freddie Francis and starring Albert Lieven, Gary Raymond, Catherine Schell and Klaus Kinski. It was made by Rialto Film using Hammer Films' Freddie Francis and screenwriter Jimmy Sangster updating the 1927 novel The Traitor's Gate by Edgar Wallace to the mid-1960s. The film features a group of criminals planning to steal the Crown Jewels of the United Kingdom from the Tower of London. It was shot at Twickenham Studios and on location around London. The film's sets were designed by the art director Tony Inglis.

Cast

Reception
In Germany, the FSK gave the film a rating of "12 and up" and found it not appropriate for screenings on public holidays. It premiered on 18 December 1964.

References

External links

1964 films
1960s crime thriller films
West German films
German crime thriller films
British crime thriller films
British black-and-white films
British heist films
Columbia Pictures films
Constantin Film films
1960s English-language films
English-language German films
Films directed by Freddie Francis
Films based on British novels
Films based on works by Edgar Wallace
Films produced by Horst Wendlandt
Films set in London
Films shot in London
Films shot at Twickenham Film Studios
Films with screenplays by Jimmy Sangster
1960s British films
1960s German films